Kappa pappadam is a variety of Papadum, from the South Indian state of Kerala. It derives its name from its main ingredient, Tapioca which is known as 'kappa' in Malayalam. 

Kappa pappadam is usually served as a snack or as an accompaniment to a rice based meal.

A 2017 film starring Fahadh Fazil is also titled Kappa Pappadam.

Ingredients and preparation 
The key ingredient, tapioca, is spiced with red chili, peppers, salt, cumin and asafoetida. The red chili is responsible for the characteristic brownish-orange color of kappa pappadam. Some variants appear white in color owing to the replacement of red chili with green chili.

The tapioca is diced and ground with chili, pepper, cumin and water to form a fine paste. This paste is further boiled with salt, asafoetida, coconut oil and more water till it thickens.

It is then spread out in circles on a cheesecloth or plastic sheet and is allowed to dry in the sun. Traditionally, a straw mat was used to dry the pappadams. After a few hours the pappadams are peeled and the sides reversed. After 2-3 days of good sunlight, the pappadams become crisp, indicating that they are ready to be fried. 

The dried pappadams are then deep fried in oil and served. For those who wish to refrain from deep fried dishes, the pappadams can be coated with minimal oil and microwaved for one minute.

Storage 
Once completely dried, the pappadams can to stored in an airtight container for over a year. Their long shelf life implies that these pappadams are produced in bulk in summer and are utilized for the rest of the year. The pappadams are also sold as packages containing 50-100 pieces/pack.

Regional variants 
Maracheeni Appalam is a variant of Kappa pappadam that is more popular in the South Indian state of Tamil Nadu. Some variants contain rice in addition to the tapioca as the main ingredient.

References

Indian snack foods
Flatbreads
Kerala cuisine